Andre Debose (born September 12, 1990) is a former American football wide receiver. He has also been a member of the Oakland Raiders and Indianapolis Colts. He played college football at Florida.

High School and College career
A native of Sanford, Florida, Debose attended Seminole High School, where he was teammates with Ray-Ray Armstrong. Debose helped Sanford to the FHSAA Class 6A title over Teddy Bridgewater's Miami Northwestern by catching a 40-yard pass from Armstrong for the game-winning touchdown in the final seconds. He set the School record for the most return touchdowns and was tied for the SEC record with 5.

Professional career

Oakland Raiders
Debose was selected by the Oakland Raiders in the 7th round, 221st overall in the 2015 NFL Draft. He was expected to compete for the kick return job, however, he suffered a torn Achilles during organized team activities, which placed him on season-ending injured reserve. In his second year with the club Debose was waived/injured on May 24, 2016.

Indianapolis Colts
On July 30, 2016, Debose was signed by the Indianapolis Colts. He was waived by the club in mid-August only about two-weeks later.

Toronto Argonauts 
On February 2, 2017 Debose and the Toronto Argonauts of the Canadian Football League (CFL) agreed to a contract.

On May 23, 2017, Debose was placed on the Argonauts' retired list.

References

External links 
 Florida Gators bio

1990 births
Living people
American football wide receivers
Florida Gators football players
Oakland Raiders players
Indianapolis Colts players
Players of American football from Florida
Sportspeople from Sanford, Florida